Martin Karlsson may refer to:

Martin Karlsson (ice hockey, born 1952), Swedish ice hockey player and head coach 
Martin Karlsson (ice hockey, born 1991), Swedish ice hockey player
Martin Karlsson (ice hockey, born 1996), Swedish ice hockey player